Darío Yazbek Bernal (born 30 November 1990) is a Mexican actor, known for playing Julián in The House of Flowers on Netflix.

Early life 
Yazbek is the son of Sergio Yazbek and Patricia Bernal; his siblings are the actors Tamara Yazbek Bernal (sister) and Gael García Bernal (half-brother). Surrounded by film from a young age, he went straight into acting.

Filmography

References

External links 
 

1990 births
Living people
Mexican actors
People from Mexico City